Alex Christensen (born 7 April 1967), also known by his stage names Jasper Forks or Alex C., is a German dance music producer, songwriter, and DJ generally known as the face and one of the founding members of U96. Since 2002, he has been collaborating with Yasmin K.

Music career
Christensen started in 1991 as a music producer and DJ, and had his first success in 1991 with the U96 single "Das Boot". In several countries, this track was the first techno song to reach the number one position. Since 2002, Christensen also works under the name Alex C. and frequently collaborates with Yasmin K., whom he met as a judge on the second season of Popstars.

As a producer and composer, Christensen has worked for artists such as Right Said Fred, Marky Mark, Tom Jones, *NSYNC, Rollergirl, Marianne Rosenberg, Sarah Brightman, and ATC.

Christensen represented Germany at the final of the 2009 Eurovision Song Contest in Moscow together with Oscar Loya, performing the song "Miss Kiss Kiss Bang", finishing in 20th place.

Christensen's song "Doktorspiele", which included additional vocals by Y-ass, won the 2008 Eurodanceweb Contest, determined by points assigned by a professional jury of disc jockeys, journalists, music producers, webmasters, and radio speakers from all over the world.

One of the songs produced by Christensen, ATC's "Around the World (La La La La La)", was later sampled in Beat Ink's "Around the World" in 2008 and used in Chris Webby's "La La La" in 2009.

In 2007, Christensen released the song "Du hast den schönsten Arsch der Welt" in co-operation with Y-ass. It sampled The Soundlovers' "Run Away". This song marked an international breakthrough for Christensen and it was re-released in several other languages. In some countries, the melody was adjusted to local preferences.

Jasper Forks (2010–present) 
In early 2010, Christensen adopted the name Jasper Forks to mark a move away from the dance productions he had previously been associated with. He began producing tech piano house, and his first single, "River Flows in You", made it to the top 10 of the airplay charts all across Europe. The track is composed by Korean pianist Yiruma. His follow-up single, "Alone", was released in January 2011. In 2013, he released "J'aime Le Diable".

Personal life
Christensen is married to Nicole Safft. They have a son, born in 2003.

Discography

Studio albums

Singles as Alex C.

Singles as Alex Swings Oscar Sings!

References

External links
 

1967 births
Living people
Musicians from Hamburg
Eurovision Song Contest entrants for Germany
Eurovision Song Contest entrants of 2009
German male singers
German pop singers
German songwriters
German house musicians
German dance musicians
German DJs
Electronic dance music DJs